Karaviloside is any of several related cucurbitane triterpenoid glycosides found in bitter melon vine (Momordica charantia). They include:

 Karaviloside I
 Karaviloside II
 Karaviloside III
 Karaviloside V
 Karaviloside XI

Karavilosides I, II, and III can be extracted from the M. charantia fruit with methanol.  Karavilosides III, V, and XI can be extracted from the M. charantia roots by methanol.

See also 
 Charantoside
 Goyaglycoside
 Kuguaglycoside
 Momordicoside

References 

Triterpene glycosides